Bishop Francis Murphy (20 May 1795 – 26 April 1858) was an Irish-born Roman Catholic priest and first Catholic Bishop of Adelaide, South Australia.

Early years
Murphy was born at Navan, County Meath, Ireland, eldest son of Arthur Murphy, brewer and distiller, and his wife Bridget, née Flood.

Murphy was educated at St Finian's College in Navan, then the diocesan seminary and Maynooth College. was ordained deacon in 1824 and a priest in 1825; for four years he ministered to the Irish Catholics working at the Bradford woolen mills and for about seven years at St Patrick's, Liverpool, where he met Dr William Ullathorne who enlisted Murphy for the Australian mission.

Murphy arrived in Sydney in July 1838. Two years later, in November 1840, when Bishop Polding left Sydney on a visit to Europe, Murphy was appointed vicar-general of the diocese during the bishop's absence. On 8 September 1844 Murphy  was consecrated first bishop of Adelaide at St Mary's Cathedral, Sydney. In the following month he went to Adelaide, calling in at Port Phillip where he officiated at the first Pontifical High Mass celebrated in Melbourne.

First Bishop of Adelaide
When Murphy began his work in Adelaide, he did not have a church, school or presbytery; and only one priest to assist him. People had gathered for Mass at private homes until Protestant businessman John Bentham Neals offered the use of a wooden store-house. Murphy continued to use the store-house until 1845.
He was advised that a Mr William Leigh of Leamington, England, had purchased a number of town acres in Adelaide via his agent, John Morphett. After Leigh's conversion to Catholicism in 1844, he provided Murphy with the resources to purchase four acres in West Adelaide. Leigh also gave £2,000 to the Adelaide diocese for the construction of a church and presbytery. This money was invaluable at the moment, and though the adherents of the church were few in number and their means were mostly small, in less than two years there were three churches, and an additional priest had arrived. 

In common with the other faiths, the Roman Catholic church was allotted a small government grant for five years from 1846, and in that year Murphy visited Europe, returning in 1847 with two additional priests. In 1849, Murphy felt it necessary to renounce the government grant on account of the conditions imposed with it. The gold rush to Victoria in 1851 very nearly emptied Adelaide and the diocese was in great difficulties. One of the priests, however, followed his flock to the diggings, and succeeded in raising £1,500 which was spent on land as an endowment for the diocese, and, soon afterward, Mr Leigh presented it with a farm of  near Adelaide.

Many of his flock who joined the gold rush to Victoria sent their gold to him to sell and hold in trust or buy land for them. Murphy was untiring in his work, travelling and preaching in all the settled parts of the colony, and his diocese gradually prospered. At the time of his death there were 21 churches and 13 priests, and Catholic education had been established. 

His amiable character led to his being asked on more than one occasion to act as mediator when difficulties arose in other dioceses, and while on a mission of this kind in Tasmania in connexion with the unfortunate differences between Bishop Robert Willson and Arch-priest Therry, Murphy contracted a severe cold which developed into consumption (tuberculosis). He died at Adelaide on 26 April 1858 and is buried in St. Francis Xavier's Cathedral, Adelaide. 

Murphy was a tall, active man, simple in manner and tastes, and though sometimes hasty tempered, had a kind nature. He had a good voice, was an excellent preacher, and was eminently fitted to be the pioneer bishop in a colony where his co-religionists were comparatively few in number.

The Bishop Murphy Society has been established in the Archdiocese of Adelaide to honour the generosity of those individuals who have pledged a bequest for any of the good works of the Archdiocese.

References

1795 births
1858 deaths
19th-century Roman Catholic bishops in Australia
People from Navan
Roman Catholic bishops of Adelaide
People educated at St Finian's College
Alumni of St Patrick's College, Maynooth
19th-century Irish Roman Catholic priests
Irish emigrants to colonial Australia